Sahneh (also Romanized as Şaḩneh and Sehneh; also known as Sahna) is a city in and the capital of Sahneh County, Kermanshah Province, Iran.  At the 2006 census, its population was 34,133, in 8,861 families.

References

Populated places in Sahneh County
Cities in Kermanshah Province